Delhi School of Professional Studies and Research, is a business school located in New Delhi, India. The school was established in 1998 along with the establishment of Guru Gobind Singh Indraprastha University from which the College has gained affiliation.

Programmes
 Bachelor of Business Administration (BBA) is a three-year undergraduate programme for which the Institute is affiliated with Guru Gobind Singh Indraprastha University.
 Post Graduate Diploma in Management (PGDM) is AICTE, Ministry of HRD, Govt. of India approved programme and not affiliated to any University.

References

External links

Business schools in Delhi
Universities and colleges in Delhi
Colleges of the Guru Gobind Singh Indraprastha University
1999 establishments in Delhi